A pole of inaccessibility with respect to a geographical criterion of inaccessibility marks a location that is the most challenging to reach according to that criterion. Often it refers to the most distant point from the coastline, implying a maximum degree of continentality or oceanity. In these cases, a pole of inaccessibility can be defined as the center of the largest circle that can be drawn within an area of interest without encountering a coast. Where a coast is imprecisely defined, the pole will be similarly imprecise.

Northern pole of inaccessibility

The Northern pole of inaccessibility, sometimes known as the Arctic pole, is located on the Arctic Ocean pack ice at a distance farthest from any land mass. The original position was wrongly believed to lie at 84°03′N 174°51′W. It is not clear who first defined this point but it may have been Sir Hubert Wilkins, who wished to traverse the Arctic Ocean by aircraft, in 1927. He was finally successful in 1928. In 1968 Sir Wally Herbert came very close to reaching what was then considered to be the position by dogsled but by his own account, "Across The Roof Of The World", did not make it due to the flow of sea ice. In 1986, an expedition of Soviet polar scientists led by Dmitry Shparo claimed to reach the original position by foot during a polar night.

In 2005, explorer Jim McNeill asked scientists from National Snow and Ice Data Center and Scott Polar Research Institute to re-establish the position using modern GPS and satellite technology. This was published as a paper in the Polar Record, Cambridge University Press in 2013. McNeill launched his own, unsuccessful, attempt to reach the new position in 2006, whilst measuring the depth of sea-ice for NASA. In 2010 he and his Ice Warrior team were thwarted again by the poor condition of the sea ice.

The new position lies at 85°48′N 176°9′W, 1,008 km (626 mi) from the three closest landmasses: It is 1008 km from the nearest land, on Henrietta Island in the De Long Islands, at Arctic Cape on Severnaya Zemlya, and on Ellesmere Island. It is over 200 km from the originally accepted position. Due to constant motion of the pack ice, no permanent structure can exist at this pole. As of February 2021, McNeill said that, as far as he could ascertain, no one had reached the new position of the Northern Pole of Inaccessibility - certainly not from the last landfall across the surface of the ocean and it remains an important scientific transect.

Southern pole of inaccessibility

The southern pole of inaccessibility is the point on the Antarctic continent most distant from the Southern Ocean. A variety of coordinate locations have been given for this pole. The discrepancies are due to the question of whether the "coast" is measured to the grounding line or to the edges of ice shelves, the difficulty of determining the location of the "solid" coastline, the movement of ice sheets and improvements in the accuracy of survey data over the years, as well as possible topographical errors.

Using recent datasets and cross-confirmation between the adaptive gridding and B9-Hillclimbing methods discussed below, Rees et al. (2021) identify two poles of inaccessibility for Antarctica: an "outer" pole defined by the edge of Antarctica's floating ice shelves and an "inner" pole defined by the grounding lines of these sheets.

The southern pole of inaccessibility is far more remote and difficult to reach than the geographic South Pole. A second Russian team returned there in 1967. Today, a building still remains at this location, marked by a bust of Vladimir Lenin that faces towards Moscow, and protected as a historical site.

On 4 December 2006, Team N2i, consisting of Henry Cookson, Rupert Longsdon, Rory Sweet and Paul Landry, embarked on an expedition to be the first to reach the historic pole of inaccessibility location without direct mechanical assistance, using a combination of traditional man hauling and kite skiing. The team reached the old abandoned station on 19 January 2007, rediscovering the forgotten statue of Lenin left there by the Soviets some 48 years previously. The team found that only the bust on top of the building remained visible; the rest was buried under the snow. The explorers were picked up from the spot by a plane from Vostok base, flown to Progress Base and taken back to Cape Town on the Akademik Fyodorov, a Russian polar research vessel.

On 27 December 2011, Sebastian Copeland and partner Eric McNair-Laundry also reached the  southern pole of inaccessibility.

As mentioned above, due to improvements in technology and the position of the continental edge of Antarctica being debated, the exact position of the best estimate of the pole of inaccessibility may vary. However, for the convenience of sport expeditions, a fixed point is preferred, and the Soviet station has been used for this role. This has been recognized by Guinness World Records for Team N2i's expedition in 2006–2007.

Oceanic pole of inaccessibility

It represents the solution to the "longest swim" problem. This problem poses that there is one place in an ocean on earth where, if a person fell overboard while on a ship at sea, they would be at a point that is the longest distance to any land in any direction. Those vertices are Pandora (part of the Ducie Island atoll among the Pitcairn Islands) to the north; Motu Nui (adjacent to Easter Island) to the northeast; and Maher Island (near the larger Siple Island, off the coast of Marie Byrd Land, Antarctica) to the south. The exact coordinates of Point Nemo depend on what the exact coordinates of these three islands are since the nature of the "longest swim" problem means that the ocean point is equally far from each.

Point Nemo was first discovered by Croatian survey engineer Hrvoje Lukatela in 1992. In 2022, Lukatela recalculated the coordinates of Point Nemo using OpenStreetMap data as well as Google Maps data in order to compare those results with the coordinates he first calculated using Digital Chart of the World data.

The point and the areas around it have attracted literary and cultural attention. It is known as Point Nemo, a reference to Jules Verne's Captain Nemo from the novel 20,000 Leagues Under the Sea. This novel was a childhood favorite of Lukatela's so he named it after Captain Nemo.

The general area plays a major role in the 1928 short story "The Call of Cthulhu" by H. P. Lovecraft, as holding the location of the fictional city of R'lyeh, although this story was written 66 years before the identification of Point Nemo. The area is nowadays known as a "spacecraft cemetery" because hundreds of decommissioned satellites, space stations, and other spacecraft have been made to fall there upon re-entering the atmosphere, to lessen the risk of hitting inhabited locations or maritime traffic. The International Space Station (ISS) is planned to crash into Point Nemo in 2031.

Point Nemo is relatively lifeless; its location within the South Pacific Gyre blocks nutrients from reaching the area, and being so far from land it gets little nutrient run-off from coastal waters.

To the west the region of the South Pacific Ocean is also the site of the geographic center of the water hemisphere, at  near New Zealand's Bounty Islands.

Continental poles of inaccessibility

Eurasia

The Eurasian pole of inaccessibility (EPIA) is located in northwestern China, near the Kazakhstan border. It is also the furthest possible point on land from the ocean, given that Eurasia (or even merely Asia alone) is the largest continent on Earth.

However, the previous pole location disregards the Gulf of Ob as part of the oceans, and a 2007 study proposes two other locations as the ones farther from any ocean (within the uncertainty of coastline definition): EPIA1  and EPIA2 , located respectively at 2,510±10 km (1560±6 mi) and 2,514±7 km (1,562±4 mi) from the oceans. These points lie in a close triangle about the Dzungarian Gate, a significant historical gateway to migration between the East and West.

Elsewhere in Xinjiang, the location  in the southwestern suburbs of Ürümqi (Ürümqi County) was designated by local geography experts as the "center point of Asia" in 1992, and a monument to this effect was erected there in the 1990s. The site is a local tourist attraction.

Coincidentally, the continental and oceanic poles of inaccessibility have a similar radius; the Eurasian poles EPIA1 and EPIA2 are about  closer to the ocean than the oceanic pole is to land.

Africa

North America

The pole was marked in 2021 with a marker that represents the 7 Lakota Values and the four colors of the Lakota Medicine Wheel.

South America
In 2017, the Turner Twins became the first adventurers to trek to the South American Pole of Inaccessibility. In 2019, it turns out there is a second South American PIA to the north, its position varying greatly between the two coastline datasets used.

Australia

Methods of calculation
As detailed below, several factors determine how a pole is calculated using computer modeling.

Poles are calculated with respect to a particular coastline dataset. Currently used datasets are the GSHHG (Global Self-consistent, Hierarchical, High-resolution Geography Database) as well as OpenStreetMap (OSM) planet dumps. The GSHHG claims 500-meter precision for 90% of identifiable coastal features, while the volunteer-build OSM give no such guarantee but nevertheless "have characteristics suggesting accuracy".

Next, a distance function must be determined for calculating distances between coastlines and potential Poles. Some works tended to project data onto planes or perform spherical calculations; more recently, other works have used different algorithms and high-performance computing with ellipsoidal calculations.

Finally, an optimization algorithm must be developed. Several works use the 2007 adaptive grid method of Garcia-Castellanos and Lombardo. In this method, a rectangular grid of, e.g., 21×21 points is created. Each point's distance from the coastline is determined and the point farthest from the coast identified. The grid is then recentered on this point and shrunk by some factor. This process iterates until the grid becomes very small (e.g. at 100-meter precision). Some authors claim this method could sink into a local minimum. A more recent method from 2019, B9-Hillclimbing by Barnes, uses a polyhedron in 3D space to find initial points evenly spaced by 100 kilometers. These points are then grouped; the more "unique" points are subject to numerical optimization (hill climbing, simulated annealing) for the farthest distance, accelerated by a 3D Cartesian point cloud. Rees (2021) shows that the two methods agree with each other to meter level.

To date there has been no meta-study of the various works, and the algorithms and datasets they use. However, successive works have compared themselves with previous calculations and claimed improvement. For example, the GC & L article from 2007 was able to find hundred-kilometer errors in the "traditional" Eurasian PIA in Crane & Crane, 1987. Rees using the same method updated the arctic PIA by over 200 kilometers. Barnes, which improved upon the method and the dataset used, was able to improve the GC & L South American PIA by 50 kilometers, showing that bad coastline data caused an error of 57 kilometers in their reported PIA-to-coast distance.

List of poles of inaccessibility
Poles of Inaccessibility, as determined by some authors, are listed in the table below. This list is incomplete and may not capture all works done to date.

ArcGIS personeel had written an 2015 page with their calculations based on a flat Earth. The results are too inaccurate to be included here.

See also
 Antipodes
 Pole of Inaccessibility research station
 Geographical pole
 Extremes on Earth
 Land and water hemispheres
 Geographical centre
 List of mainland settlements that are inaccessible by road

References

External links

 How to calculate PIAs
 Team N2i successfully conquer the Pole of Inaccessibility by foot and kite on 19th Jan '07

Lists of coordinates
Polar regions of the Earth
Geography of the Arctic
Geography of Antarctica
Extreme points of Earth